Matthew Rhys Evans (born 8 November 1974) is a Welsh actor who is best known for playing Kevin Walker in the family drama series Brothers & Sisters (2006–2011) and Philip Jennings in spy drama series The Americans (2013–2018). He has received several awards including  a Primetime Emmy Award and nominations for three Golden Globe Awards. 

In film, Rhys appeared as Dylan Thomas in The Edge of Love (2008) and as Daniel Ellsberg in The Post (2017) and starred as a cynical journalist in A Beautiful Day in the Neighborhood (2019). Since 2020, he has played the titular role in the HBO period series Perry Mason, for which he received his third Golden Globe nomination. Since 2020, he has voiced Emperor Belos in the animated series The Owl House.

Early life
Rhys was born in Cardiff, Wales, on 8 November 1974 (some sources say 4 November). His first language is Welsh. He grew up in Cardiff and attended Welsh-medium schools, Ysgol Gynradd Gymraeg Melin Gruffydd (in Whitchurch, Cardiff) and Ysgol Gyfun Gymraeg Glantaf (in Llandaff North, Cardiff). In 1993, he was awarded the Patricia Rothermere Scholarship.

At age 17, after playing Elvis Presley in a school musical, he applied to and was accepted at the Royal Academy of Dramatic Art (RADA) in London.

During Rhys's time at RADA, he appeared in the BBC police series Backup and in House of America. He returned to Cardiff to act in his own language in the Welsh film Bydd yn Wrol (Be Brave), for which he won Best Actor at the BAFTA Cymru (Welsh BAFTAs).

Career

In January 1998, Rhys went to New Zealand to star in Greenstone, a colonial costume drama for television. He then landed a role in Titus, Julie Taymor's adaptation of Titus Andronicus, starring Anthony Hopkins and Jessica Lange. Next he played Ray in Peter Hewitt's film comedy, Whatever Happened to Harold Smith? After returning to Wales, he did two consecutive films with Jonathan Pryce: The Testimony of Taliesin Jones, a film about a dysfunctional single-parent family in which he played the elder son, and Sara Sugarman's comedy Very Annie Mary, in which he played the role of Nob. Rhys would later reunite with Very Annie Mary star Rachel Griffiths on Brothers & Sisters.

In 2000, Rhys played the lead role in Metropolis, a drama series for Granada TV about the lives of six twenty-somethings living in London. Next he starred in Peaches, the film of the play written and directed by Nick Grosso. Rhys starred as Benjamin in the 2000 world premiere of the stage adaptation of The Graduate, alongside Kathleen Turner at the Gielgud Theatre in London's West End.

Rhys travelled to Ireland to star in the 18th-century swashbuckling adventure, The Abduction Club. He played the lead role of Darren Daniels in Tabloid, and then returned to New Zealand to shoot the epic drama The Lost World for the BBC. His other film credits include the independent horror film Deathwatch in Prague and Fakers, a comic crime caper.

In 2003, he played Justin Price in the final episode of the long-running television series Columbo.

He appeared opposite Brittany Murphy in the independent feature Love and Other Disasters, in Virgin Territory opposite Hayden Christensen, Tim Roth and Mischa Barton, and playing poet Dylan Thomas in the love quadrangle biographical film The Edge of Love.

He moved to Santa Monica after being cast in ABC's show Brothers & Sisters, as gay lawyer Kevin Walker. The show had a five-season run, coming to an end in 2011.

In January 2012, Rhys appeared in a BBC Two two-part drama adaptation of Charles Dickens' last novel, The Mystery of Edwin Drood, left unfinished at his death in 1870. The Public Broadcasting Service (PBS) aired it in the United States as one feature-length episode on 15 April 2012.

In 2012, Rhys reprised Sir Alec Guinness' 1959 double role of John Barratt / Jacques DeGué in a new adaptation of Daphne du Maurier's The Scapegoat. That same year, Rhys was cast as "Jimmy" in the Roundabout Theatre Company's Off-Broadway revival of John Osborne's play, Look Back in Anger, at the Laura Pels Theatre in the Harold and Miriam Steinberg Center for Theatre. The production played a limited engagement through 8 April 2012. In 2013, Rhys starred in the television adaptation of the P. D. James novel Death Comes to Pemberley as Jane Austen hero Fitzwilliam Darcy.

He starred opposite Keri Russell in the FX series The Americans, a 1980s Cold War spy drama about Russian KGB sleeper agents (Rhys and Russell, who portray married KGB agents with two children, among other agents and handlers). Rhys and Russell are real-life partners off-screen as well. The show debuted in January 2013. The sixth season airing in 2018 was the final season of The Americans. Rhys received a Primetime Emmy Award for the sixth season. 

On 15 July 2008, Rhys was honoured by Aberystwyth University as a Fellow. On 8 August 2008, he was honoured at the Welsh National Eisteddfod by being accepted as a member to the druidic order of the Gorsedd of the Bards, for his contributions to the Welsh language and Wales. His bardic name in the Gorsedd is Matthew Tâf. In August 2009, Rhys took to the stage with the National Youth Orchestra of Wales as part of the National Eisteddfod.

Personal life
Rhys has been in a relationship with his The Americans co-star Keri Russell since 2014. They had their first child, a son, in 2016. In interviews conducted in 2021, they referred to each other as husband and wife.

He is a supporter of Plaid Cymru and also supports Welsh independence.

Affiliations
 Patron, Hijinx Theatre, based at Wales Millennium Centre, Cardiff Bay
 Patron, Asylum Justice, a charity based in Cardiff, Wales, that provides free legal advice and representation for asylum seekers and other vulnerable migrants
 Charity Champion, The Noah's Ark Appeal, a charity that raises funds for the development of the Children's Hospital for Wales
 Patron, Iris Prize, Cardiff's International Gay and Lesbian Short Film Prize
 Ambassador, Bobath Children's Therapy Centre Wales, a charity that treats children with cerebral palsy from all over Wales

Filmography

Film

Television

Theatre

Other projects, contributions
 Produced television documentary, Mr Hollywood, for S4C-TV (2010), about the life of Griffith J. Griffith, Welsh-American industrialist and philanthropist after whom Griffith Park is named.
 Wrote Patagonia: Crossing the Plain (2010) – a photographic account of his month-long journey on horseback while filming a documentary on Patagonia, and the Welsh settlers who made it their home having journeyed from Wales in the late 19th century.
 Set up his own production company, Patagonia (2011), which has two projects in development. One of them involves the adaptation of a book called Operation Julie, written by Lyn Ebenezer, about the biggest LSD drugs bust (in Wales's history); Rhys bought the film rights in December 2010.
 Set to star in the upcoming FX's TV show Wyrd and also co-produce the show alongside his partner Keri Russell.

Awards and nominations

References

External links

The Think Tank
Everything Carries Me To You

1974 births
20th-century Welsh male actors
21st-century Welsh male actors
Alumni of RADA
Bards of the Gorsedd
Living people
People educated at Ysgol Gyfun Gymraeg Glantaf
Male actors from Cardiff
Welsh male Shakespearean actors
Welsh male stage actors
Welsh male film actors
Welsh male television actors
Welsh male voice actors
Welsh-speaking actors
Welsh expatriates in the United States
Outstanding Performance by a Lead Actor in a Drama Series Primetime Emmy Award winners